Nucleotomy is a surgical procedure for removal of tissue surrounding a herniated disk.

References

External links
 https://web.archive.org/web/20130207010553/http://www.back-pain-info.com/back-pain-nucleotomy-herniated-disk.html

Surgical removal procedures